Guzmania glomerata is a flowering plant species in the genus Guzmania. This species is native to Costa Rica, Nicaragua, Panama, Colombia, and Ecuador.

References

glomerata
Flora of Central America
Flora of Ecuador
Flora of Colombia
Plants described in 1916